Lamyaa Bekkali (born 10 May 1989) is a Moroccan taekwondo practitioner. 

She won a silver medal in bantamweight at the 2011 World Taekwondo Championships, after being defeated by Ana Zaninović in the final. Her achievements at the African Taekwondo Championships include gold medals in 2009 and 2010, and a bronze medal in 2014.

References

External links

1989 births
Living people
Moroccan female taekwondo practitioners
World Taekwondo Championships medalists
African Taekwondo Championships medalists
20th-century Moroccan women
21st-century Moroccan women